The Empire 8 (E8) is an intercollegiate athletic conference affiliated with the NCAA's Division III. The E8 sponsors intercollegiate athletic competition in men's baseball, men's and women's basketball, men's and women's cross country, women's field hockey, men's football, men's golf, men's and women's lacrosse, men's and women's soccer, women's softball, men's and women's swimming and diving, men's and women's tennis, men's and women's track and field, and women's volleyball. The E8 shares offices with the United Volleyball Conference, a separate Division III league that competes solely in men's volleyball.

History

The Empire 8 can trace its beginnings back to 1964 with the founding of the Independent College Athletic Conference (ICAC). At this time, the conference was made up of Alfred University, Clarkson University, Hobart College, Rensselaer Polytechnic Institute (RPI), St. Lawrence University, and Union College. After Union left the league, Ithaca College and Rochester Institute of Technology (RIT) joined the ICAC.

In 1991, the ICAC regrouped to become the Empire Athletic Association (EAA), with Clarkson leaving and Hartwick College joining to replace the spot.  Hobart/William Smith, RPI, and St. Lawrence left in 1993, to be replaced by Elmira College, Nazareth College, and Utica University. Alfred re-joined and St. John Fisher College joined the league in 1998.

The EAA became the Empire 8 Athletic Conference in 1999, hosting 13 sports.

Stevens Institute of Technology joined as a field hockey member beginning in 2006 and became a full member in 2007. RIT announced on June 5, 2009 that it planned to leave the Empire 8 for the Liberty League beginning in the fall of the 2011–12 season. Houghton College also announced that they would join the Empire 8 in the 2012–13 season as they transitioned from a school of the National Association of Intercollegiate Athletics (NAIA) to NCAA Division III status; they became full D-III members in 2016.

The most recent changes to the conference's membership were published in the 2018–19 school year. First, Stevens announced in August 2018 that it would leave the E8 at the end of the 2018–19 school year to rejoin the Middle Atlantic Conferences after an absence of more than 40 years. Stevens joined the MAC's Freedom Conference. In January 2019, the E8 reported that Stevens would eventually be replaced by Keuka College in 2020–21, and in March, The Sage Colleges merged Russell Sage College and Sage College of Albany, effectively making the former women-only Russell Sage co-educational in fall 2020.

On July 15, 2020, the Empire 8 postponed all fall sports, but provided conference championships in those sports in spring 2021. On August 26, 2021, Medaille posted its admission to the E8 in 2022–23 from the Allegheny Mountain Collegiate Conference.

Chronological timeline
 1964 - The Empire 8 was founded of the Independent College Athletic Conference (ICAC). charter members included Alfred University, Clarkson College of Technology (now Clarkson University), Hobart College (later William Smith College followed suit when women's sports was added into the conference), Rensselaer Polytechnic Institute (RPI), St. Lawrence University, and Union College, effective beginning the 1964-65 academic year.
 1971 - Union (N.Y.) left the ICAC, effective after the 1970-71 academic year.
 1971 - Ithaca College and Rochester Institute of Technology (RIT) joined the ICAC, effective in the 1971-72 academic year.
 1991 - Alfred and Clarkson left the ICAC, effective after the 1990-91 academic year.
 1991 - The ICAC has been regrouped to become the Empire Athletic Association ( EAA), effective in the 1991-92 academic year.
 1991 - Hartwick College joined the EAA, effective in the 1991-92 academic year.
 1993 - Hobart/William Smith, Rensselaer Poly (RPI) and St. Lawrence left the EAA, effective after the 1992-93 academic year.
 1993 - Elmira College, Nazareth College and Utica College (now Utica University) joined the EAA, effective in the 1993-94 academic year.
 1998 - St. John Fisher College joined the EAA, with Alfred re-joining alongside, effective in the 1998-99 academic year.
 1999 - The EAA has been rebranded as the Empire 8 Athletic Conference (Empire 8 or E8), hosting 13 sponsored sports, effective in the 1999-2000 academic year.
 2006 - Stevens Institute of Technology (Stevens Tech or Stevens) joined the Empire 8 as an affiliate member for field hockey, effective in the 2006 fall season (2006-07 academic year).
 2007 - Stevens upgraded to join the Empire 8 for all sports, effective in the 2007-08 academic year.
 2011 - Rochester Tech (RIT) left the Empire 8 for the Liberty League, effective after the 2010-11 academic year.  Salisbury U. (MD) joined for football.
 2012 - Houghton College joined the Empire 8, effective in the 2012-13 academic year.
 2015 - Salisbury U. (MD) left to join the NJAC.
 2017 - Ithaca left the Empire 8 to join the Liberty League, effective after the 2016-17 academic year.
 2017 - Russell Sage College (then a women's college) and Sage College of Albany joined the Empire 8, effective in the 2017-18 academic year.
 2019 - Stevens left the Empire 8 to re-join back to the Middle Atlantic Conferences (particularly the MAC's Freedom Conference), effective after the 2018-19 academic year.
 2020 - Keuka College joined the Empire 8, effective in the 2020-21 academic year
 2020 - The Sage Colleges merged Russell Sage and Sage College of Albany, effective making the former women-only Russell Sage co-educational, effective in the 2020-21 academic year.
 2022 - Medaille College will join the Empire 8, effective beginning the 2022-23 academic year.

Member schools

Current members
The Empire 8 currently has ten full members, all are private schools:

Notes

Affiliate members
The Empire 8 currently has four affiliate members; all but one are public schools:

Notes

Future affiliate members

Former members
The Empire 8 had nine former full members, all were private schools:

Notes

Former affiliate members
The Empire 8 had four former affiliate members, all but one were public schools:

Notes

Membership timeline

Championships

References

External links